The Military ranks of Cameroon are the military insignia used by the Cameroon Armed Forces. Being a former colony of France, Cameroon shares a rank structure similar to that of France.

Commissioned officer ranks
The rank insignia of commissioned officers.

Other ranks
The rank insignia of non-commissioned officers and enlisted personnel.

References

External links
 

Cameroon
Ranks